Henry Louis Davis (November 8, 1942 – June 11, 2000) was an American football player.  He played professionally as a linebacker in the National Football League (NFL). He was drafted by the New York Giants in the 11th round of the 1968 NFL Draft. He played college football at Grambling State.  Davis was a Pro Bowl selection with the Pittsburgh Steelers for the 1972 season.

References

1942 births
2000 deaths
American football linebackers
Grambling State Tigers football players
New York Giants players
Pittsburgh Steelers players
People from East Feliciana Parish, Louisiana
Players of American football from Louisiana